Kangersuatsiaq (old spelling: Kangerssuatsiaq), formerly Prøven, is an island settlement in the Avannaata municipality in northwestern Greenland. It had 130 inhabitants in 2020.

Upernavik Archipelago 

Kangersuatsiaq is located within Upernavik Archipelago, a vast archipelago of small islands on the coast of northeastern Baffin Bay.

Transport 
Air Greenland serves the village as part of government contract, with flights between Kangersuatsiaq Heliport and Upernavik Airport.

Population 
The population of Kangersuatsiaq has decreased by over a quarter relative to the 2000 levels, and is still decreasing.

References 

Populated places in Greenland
Populated places of Arctic Greenland
Upernavik Archipelago